Immaculate Heart College was a private, Catholic college located in Los Angeles, California. The college offered various courses including art and  religious education studies.

By June 1906, six young women had become the first graduates of the adjacent Immaculate Heart High School. The  college campus was owned and conducted  by the Sisters of the Immaculate Heart of Mary who had founded Immaculate Heart Convent and High School on their  property in 1905. The high school still specialises in preparing its students for university education.

In the following decades, both Immaculate Heart High School  and the College soon established their reputations as an excellent university preparatory school for girls and co-educational  center respectively. By far the majority of the high school's more than 10,000 graduates continued their education at colleges and universities across the country. The women - and male graduates of the college - have served with distinction as artists, musicians, educators, journalists, doctors, lawyers, judges, and stars of stage and screen.  Some Immaculate Heart women were pioneers in professions not accustomed to having women.
  
The religious community's original convent building, much of which was torn down in the early 1970s, included classrooms for high school and elementary students, boarding facilities for girls, offices and living quarters for the sisters. The Jo Anne Cotsen Building was formerly the Immaculate Heart College Student Union Building.  It was purchased by the American Film Institute in 1983.

In the late 1960s, in response to directives from Vatican II as well as participation in therapy experiments run by researchers from the Esalen Institute, the Sisters followed the guidance of Pope Paul VI and conducted an extensive review of their structure and proposed changes in how they prayed, worked, lived together and governed themselves.  However, the Archbishop of Los Angeles, Cardinal James Francis McIntyre, was opposed to all of the sisters' proposed changes, leading to a public dispute where he ordered the removal of all Immaculate Heart Sisters teaching in Los Angeles diocesan schools, and finally presented the Community with an ultimatum: either conform to the standards of traditional religious life or seek dispensation from vows.  In the end, 90% chose to dispense from their vows and reorganize as a nonprofit organization (501(c)(3)), The Immaculate Heart Community, a voluntary lay community. Patricia Reif played an important part in encouraging the establishment of an ecumenical community.

Corita Kent was a member of the Community and obtained her degree from IHC. Sister Corita  taught art at the College between 1938 and 1968.

The College closed in 1981 due to financial difficulties; its successor was the Immaculate Heart College Center, which closed in 2000.

Notable alumni
Corita Kent, artist
Karen Boccalero, artist, nun, founder of Self-Help Graphics & Art in Los Angeles
Angie Dickinson, actress, Police Woman
Mark Ridley-Thomas, California legislator
Cherríe Moraga, playwright and activist
Helena Maria Viramontes, novelist and short story writer, Professor of English, Cornell University
 Lucia Capacchione, art therapist
Charlotte Caffey, musician and songwriter, "The Go-Go's"
Pat Carroll, voice actress and actress well known for the voice of Ursula in the Little Mermaid
Demi (author), artist and author/illustrator
Jennifer Warnes, Grammy Award winning singer, songwriter, producer
Grace Perreiah, artist

References

External links
Official Immaculate Heart Community Website
The Corita Art Center, part of the Community

Defunct private universities and colleges in California
Defunct Catholic universities and colleges in the United States
Educational institutions established in 1916
Educational institutions disestablished in 1981
1916 establishments in California